Bengal was launched in 1811 as an East Indiaman for the British East India Company (EIC). She made one voyage for the EIC, but was burnt on the inbound leg of her second voyage.

EIC voyage #1 (1812-1813): Captain George Nicholls acquired a letter of marque on 25 January 1812. He sailed from Portsmouth on 10 March 1812, bound for Madras and Bengal. Bengal reached Madras on 9 July, and arrived at Diamond Harbour on 25 July. Homeward bound, she was at Saugor on 16 October, reached St Helena on 14 February 1813, and arrived at Long Reach on 16 May.

EIC voyage #2 (1814-Loss): Captain Nicholls sailed from Portsmouth on 10 May 1814, bound for Madras and Bengal. Bengal was among the Indiamen planning to leave Bengal on 3 January 1815, touching at Pointe de Galle, Ceylon, and the Cape of Good Hope on their way to England. She was at Pointe de Galle when a mistake by the gunner on 18 January 1815 led to a fire breaking out. The fire raced through Bengal killing 20 people, but all the women and children survived. Among the casualties were a lieutenant from Malacca, and her master.

The EIC valued the cargo it lost on Bengal at £87,738.

Citations

References
 
 
  

1811 ships
Ships of the British East India Company
Age of Sail merchant ships of England
Maritime incidents in 1815